Holy Family is a private, independent traditionalist Catholic chapel located behind a guarded gate at 30188 W. Mulholland Highway, Agoura Hills, California, United States. It is not affiliated with the Roman Catholic Archdiocese of Los Angeles. Its 70 or so members are traditional Catholics, including some that hold a sedevacantism position. They reject many or all of the reforms introduced by the Second Vatican Council and worship according to earlier Roman Catholic rites including the Tridentine Mass. 

The Rev. Clement Procopio, a Franciscan priest, was instructed not to offer Mass in the Diocese by Phoenix Bishop Thomas J. O'Brien. The chapel is supported by the non-profit A.P. Reilly Foundation, which is funded by actor/director Mel Gibson. According to 2008 IRS filings, the foundation's assets, including real property, total $42 million.

References

Traditionalist Catholicism
Churches in Los Angeles County, California
Roman Catholic churches in California
Mel Gibson